The 8th Corps is a field corps of the Turkish Army. It is headquartered at Elazığ in Elazığ Province. It appeared to have been under command of General Osman Erbaş, until his death in a 2021 helicopter crash. Current leadership after the crash is unknown.

Subunits 

 12th Mechanized Infantry Division  
 10th Motorized Infantry Brigade
 34th Motorized Infantry Brigade
 12th Mechanized Infantry Brigade
 4th Commando Brigade
 225th Motorized Infantry Brigade
 17th Motorized Infantry Brigade
 49th Motorized Infantry Brigade
 51st Motorized Infantry Brigade
 108th Artillery Regiment

References 

Corps of Turkey